The Burke River is a river of New Zealand's South Island, located in Mount Aspiring National Park.

The river was named by Julius von Haast when he searched for a crossing from Otago to the West Coast. It is named for Robert O'Hara Burke of the Burke and Wills expedition. The nearby Wills River is named for William John Wills.

See also
List of rivers of New Zealand

References

Land Information New Zealand - Search for Place Names

Rivers of the West Coast, New Zealand
Mount Aspiring National Park
Rivers of New Zealand